Proston Weir is a weir located on Stuart River.

Recreation
As the weir is not as popular as the nearby Boondooma Dam, the weir doesn't provide any picnic or toilet facilities. Fuel-powered vessels are not recommended on the weir because of the limited space, though electric and non-motorized vessels are permitted.

Dangerous current
When the weir overflows the current becomes strong 200m upstream of the wall. As there aren't any safety barriers on the wall, swimming or kayaking on the weir (especially at the wall and 200m upstream) after heavy rain is considered extremely dangerous and being washed over the wall may result in severe injury

Dams in Queensland
Weirs
South Burnett Region